Namestnikov is a Russian masculine surname, its feminine counterpart is Namestnikova. It may refer to
Evgeny Namestnikov (born 1971), Russian ice hockey player, father of Vladislav 
Vladislav Namestnikov (born 1992), Russian-American professional ice hockey forward

Russian-language surnames